Little Women is a 1994 American coming-of-age historical drama film directed by Gillian Armstrong. The screenplay by Robin Swicord is based on Louisa May Alcott's 1868-69 two-volume novel of the same title, the fifth feature film adaptation of the classic story. After a limited release on December 25, 1994, the film was released nationwide four days later by Columbia Pictures.

The film received critical acclaim and grossed $95 million worldwide. The film received three Academy Award nominations for Best Actress (Ryder), Best Costume Design, and Best Original Score. It was followed by a loose sequel, Little Men, and a reboot released in 2019 also titled Little Women.

Plot
The March sisters: responsible Meg, tempestuous Jo, tender Beth, and romantic Amy, are growing up in Concord, MA during and after the American Civil War. Their father is fighting in the war and, with their strong-willed mother, Marmee (pronounced "Mahmee") they struggle with major and minor problems in 19th century New England. The girls revel in performing Jo's romantic plays in their attic theater.

Next door neighbor, wealthy Mr. Laurence's grandson Theodore ("Laurie") moves in, becoming a close friend of the Marches, particularly Jo. Mr. Laurence mentors Beth, whose exquisite piano-playing reminds him of his deceased daughter, and Meg falls in love with Laurie's tutor John Brooke.

When Mr. March is wounded, Jo sells her hair so Marmee can go by train to nurse him back to health. While she is away, Beth continues visiting a struggling immigrant family, providing food and firewood. She contracts scarlet fever from them. Awaiting Marmee's return, Meg and Jo, who both previously survived scarlet fever, send Amy away to live safely with their Aunt March. Amy laments to Laurie that she may die without ever being kissed. He promises to kiss her before she dies if she becomes ill.

Prior to Beth's illness, Jo had been Aunt March's companion for several years, and although she didn't enjoy it, she hoped she would take her to Europe. Beth gets worse, so Marmee returns home, nursing her to recovery in time for Christmas, but the illness has severely weakened her. Mr. Laurence gives his daughter's piano to Beth, Meg accepts John Brooke's proposal and Mr. March surprises them, returning home from the war.

Four years pass; Meg (now 20) and John marry, and Beth's health is worsening. Graduating from college, Laurie proposes to Jo (now 19) and asks her to go to London with him but, seeing him more as a brother than a lover, she refuses. Jo is disappointed when Aunt March decides to take 17-year-old Amy with her to Europe instead of her. She has been Aunt March's companion and wishes to further her artistic training in Europe. Crushed, Jo departs for New York City to pursue writing and experience life. There she meets Friedrich Bhaer, a German professor who challenges and stimulates her intellectually, introducing her to opera and philosophy, and encouraging her to write better stories than the lurid Victorian melodramas she has penned so far.

In Europe, Amy is reunited with Laurie. Disappointed to find he has become dissolute and irresponsible; she scolds him for pursuing her merely to become part of the March family. In return, he bitterly rebukes her for courting one of his wealthy college friends to marry into money. He asks Amy to wait for him in a letter while he works in London for his grandfather and makes himself worthy.

Jo is called home for eighteen-year-old Beth, who finally dies of the after-effects of scarlet fever (presumably rheumatic heart disease) that plagued her for the past four years. A saddened Jo retreats to the comfort of the attic, writing her life story. Upon completion, she sends it to Professor Bhaer. Meanwhile, Meg has fraternal twins Demi and Daisy.

A letter from Amy tells them Aunt March is too ill to travel, so Amy must remain in Europe with her. In London, Laurie receives a letter from Jo about Beth's death, saying Amy is in Vevey, unable to come home. He immediately goes to be at Amy's side. They finally return to the March home as spouses, to Jo's surprise and eventual delight.

Aunt March dies, leaving Jo her house. She turns it into a school. Professor Bhaer arrives with the printed galley proofs of her manuscript but, believing Jo is married, he departs to catch a train to the West, to accept a professorship. Jo runs after him, explaining the misunderstanding. She begs him not to go, he proposes, and she happily accepts.

Cast
 Winona Ryder as Josephine "Jo" March, an ambitious young woman, who longs to become a successful author.
 Gabriel Byrne as Friedrich Bhaer, an older professor who falls in love with Jo while he works as a tutor in New York and eventually marries her.
 Trini Alvarado as Margaret "Meg" March, the oldest March sister. She marries Laurie's tutor, John Brooke, and gives birth to fraternal twins: a boy, John (nicknamed "Demijohn" by Jo, which is shortened to "Demi"); and a girl, Margaret, called "Daisy" at home "so as to not have two Megs".
 Kirsten Dunst and Samantha Mathis as Amy March, the youngest March child and quick-witted daughter. Instead of the brown hair and brown or green eyes of her three older sisters, she has golden curls and blue eyes. She later marries Laurie and becomes a successful painter. Amy was the only character played by two different actresses - Dunst portrayed her at twelve years old in the first half of the movie, Mathis as a seventeen-year-old in the second half of the movie.
 Claire Danes as Elizabeth "Beth" March, the third March daughter and the pianist of the family. She is shy, good, sweet, kindly, and loyal. At the young age of fourteen, she contracted scarlet fever, which weakened her heart and resulted in her death four years later at the age of eighteen.
 Christian Bale as Theodore "Laurie" Laurence, the young neighbor who becomes Jo's best friend in their youth. Later, he tries, but fails, to convince her to marry him. He eventually falls in love with and marries Amy.
 Eric Stoltz as John Brooke, Laurie's tutor and Meg's eventual husband.
 John Neville as Mr. James Laurence, Laurie's grandfather and a kind neighbor of the Marches.
 Mary Wickes as Aunt Josephine March, the only March family member who still has a lot of money. Upon her death, her estate is left to adult Jo, who transforms it into a school for boys.
 Susan Sarandon as Abigail "Marmee" March, the mother of the March daughters and the loving wife of Mr. March.
 Matthew Walker as Robert March, the father of the four March daughters, Marmee's loving husband, and long-time devoted spouse.
 Florence Paterson as Hannah Mullet, the loyal housekeeper of the March family since Meg was born. The girls think of her more as a good friend than a servant.
 Janne Mortil as Sally Moffat, Meg's one and only good friend, who is quite rich and prosperous.
 Donal Logue as Jacob Mayer
 Gina Christodoulou as Dancer

Development
It took Little Women 12 years to find a studio. According to writer Robin Swicord and producer Denise Di Novi "people just weren't interested in a movie with a lot of women...". One executive suggested a modern version. "...the Marches are in the 90s and not happy about not having a car for Christmas". In the industry films like Little Women were referred to as "needle in the eye" pictures. They were assumed to have no appeal to male audiences and deemed not worth the risk of production. Eventually, Columbia agreed to consider the project under the condition that Winona Ryder was to play Jo.

Originally, Gillian Armstrong wasn't on board with directing Little Women. She rejected the offer several times due to the similarities between Little Women and her previous film, My Brilliant Career. However, with persuasion from Denise DiNovi and Amy Pascal (the producers), Armstrong came to realize that the two films were different after all. With the help of screenwriter, Robin Swicord, they aimed to portray more mature themes than the previous adaptations— such as, family, growing up, and progressive feminism. When co-writing, Armstrong chose not to look back at the previous films for inspiration but instead decided to stay true to the novel.

Casting
Along with Winona Ryder, already signed on to play Jo, offers for the roles of Marmee and Laurie were sent out to Susan Sarandon and Christian Bale. Sarandon almost turned down the role because "... it was towards the end of the school year, and I had a pretty strict policy about not leaving my young kids". 

The part of Amy was the most difficult casting decision to be made. This adaptation was the first and only to have two different actresses play Amy over the course of the film. According to producer Denise Di Novi, there was something "weird" about having one actress playing first a child and then an adult: "It just didn't work." 

Among those to read for the role of Amy were the then-unknown Natalie Portman, and Thora Birch who had already filmed Hocus Pocus and Patriot Games. In the end, Kirsten Dunst was chosen - Armstrong mentioned in a 2019 interview that "Kirsten Dunst really blew [other young Amy candidates] out of the water". The decision for the role of the older Amy was close between Reese Witherspoon and Samantha Mathis. Armstrong's first pick, if the production had decided on casting one actress to play Amy, was Witherspoon, "... the very best person we auditioned was Witherspoon. She was also short...". However, casting director Carrie Frazier finally decided to settle on Mathis.

The initial candidate to play Bhaer, for di Novi, was Hugh Grant. "We all had a huge crush on Hugh". However, Frazier was not on board the idea, claiming that the option was a bit "off the rails". Grant was too young and confident to play the Bhaer of the book that Frazier, Di Novi, and Armstrong wanted. John Turturro also lobbied persistently for the role, but Frazier wanted a deeper and more poetic Bhaer, and decided on Gabriel Byrne.

Filming 
The 1994 adaptation of Little Women was filmed primarily in parts of Canada, such as Vancouver Island and Vancouver, both in the province of British Columbia. However, certain scenes were shot in the United States, throughout Massachusetts. Gillian Armstrong was adamant about creating a look that remained faithful to Little Women's time period. The overall film aesthetic for the 1994 Little Women, was heavily influenced by photographs, paintings, and drawings from the era. Armstrong and cinematographer Geoffrey Simpson sought inspiration from artwork that was created during the Civil War Era, when Little Women was written. In collaboration with the rest of the crew including art director Jan Roelfs, they used these works of art as guidelines for the sets, costumes, colour coordination, and even camera lighting.

The film is dedicated to murder victim Polly Klaas and literary agent Judy Scott-Fox.

Reception

Critical reception
On Rotten Tomatoes, 93% of 42 reviews were positive, with an average rating of 7.3/10. The site's critics consensus reads, "Thanks to a powerhouse lineup of talented actresses, Gillian Armstrong's take on Louisa May Alcott's Little Women proves that a timeless story can succeed no matter how many times it's told." On Metacritic, the film has a weighted average score of 87 out of 100 based on 23 critics, indicating "universal acclaim". Audiences polled by CinemaScore gave the film a grade of "A" on an A+ to F scale. Ratings were positive across all ages and groups, with the lowest being an A-minus grade from men.

Roger Ebert of the Chicago Sun-Times awarded the film 3 stars, calling it "a surprisingly sharp and intelligent telling of Louisa May Alcott's famous story, and not the soft-edged children's movie it might appear." He added, "[It] grew on me. At first, I was grumpy, thinking it was going to be too sweet and devout. Gradually, I saw that Gillian Armstrong [...] was taking it seriously. And then I began to appreciate the ensemble acting, with the five actresses creating the warmth and familiarity of a real family."

Edward Guthmann of the San Francisco Chronicle called the film "meticulously crafted and warmly acted" and observed it "is one of the rare Hollywood studio films that invites your attention, slowly and elegantly, rather than propelling your interest with effects and easy manipulation."

Box office
The film opened on 1,503 screens in the US and Canada on December 21, 1994. It grossed $5.3 million and ranked number 6 at the box office on its opening weekend and eventually grossed $50.1 million in the United States and Canada. Internationally, it grossed $45 milion for a worldwide total of $95 million, against a production budget of $15–18 million.

Accolades

Year-end lists
 2nd – Mack Bates, The Milwaukee Journal
 3rd – Michael MacCambridge, Austin American-Statesman
 5th – Sean P. Means, The Salt Lake Tribune
 5th – Dan Craft, The Pantagraph
 6th – Yardena Arar, Los Angeles Daily News
 8th – Scott Schuldt, The Oklahoman
 9th – Kevin Thomas, Los Angeles Times
 10th – Gene Siskel, The Chicago Tribune
 Top 9 (not ranked) – Dan Webster, The Spokesman-Review
 Top 10 (listed alphabetically, not ranked) – Mike Clark, USA Today
 Top 10 (listed alphabetically, not ranked) – Matt Zoller Seitz, Dallas Observer
 Top 10 (listed alphabetically, not ranked) – Bob Ross, The Tampa Tribune
 Top 10 runner-ups (not ranked) – Janet Maslin, The New York Times
 Honorable mention – William Arnold, Seattle Post-Intelligencer
 Honorable mention – David Elliott, The San Diego Union-Tribune
 Honorable mention – Michael Mills, The Palm Beach Post

Home media
The film had its initial North American video release on VHS on June 20, 1995. It was released on DVD on April 25, 2000. The Blu-ray format was released three times. While the manufacture-on-demand version from Sony was released twice on Dec 13, 2016, and March 24, 2020, where the former was part of the Sony Choice Collection, Mill Creek Entertainment released a double feature Blu-ray on October 29, 2019, that contained Little Women and Kirsten Dunst's fellow film Marie Antoinette.

See also
 
 Little Women (1918 film)
 Little Women (1933 film)
 Little Women (1949 film)
 Little Women (2019 film)

References

External links
 
 
 
 

1990s coming-of-age drama films
1990s feminist films
1994 films
1994 romantic drama films
American Christmas films
American Civil War films
American coming-of-age drama films
American historical romance films
American romantic drama films
Coming-of-age romance films
Columbia Pictures films
Films about sisters
Films about writers
Films directed by Gillian Armstrong
Films set in Massachusetts
Films set in New York City
Films set in the 1860s
Films set in the 19th century
Films scored by Thomas Newman
Films shot in British Columbia
Films produced by Denise Di Novi
Films with screenplays by Robin Swicord
Little Women films
Films about mother–daughter relationships
1990s English-language films
1990s American films